The Louisiana History Museum is located in the historic downtown portion of Alexandria, Louisiana, USA, near the Red River. It showcases the social evolution of all of Louisiana, but centers on the history of Central Louisiana, Rapides Parish, and Alexandria. Major exhibit areas deal with Native Americans, Louisiana geography, politics, health care, farming, and the impact of war.

The old Alexandria Library building

The building housing the Museum and Alexandria Genealogical Library started life as the Alexandria Public Library in 1907. The building was constructed solely for the advancement of culture and learning in by Caldwell Brothers (contractors), and Crosby & Henkel of New Orleans (architects). It replaced an earlier library that was burned by General Nathaniel Banks' federal troops on May 13, 1864. Remodeled in 1970, restored as a Bicentennial project in 1976, and again in 2003, it now houses (upstairs) one of the largest genealogical libraries in Louisiana. The structure was placed on the National Register of Historic Places in 1989.

Museum history

The Louisiana History Museum was begun in 1971 by Angelique Stafford "Gic" Kraushaar. Her vision was to establish a museum in Alexandria that would not only describe the history of Louisiana but also show the unique beginnings and background of Central Louisiana.

Displays and exhibits

There are more than fifty displays and exhibits, including:

Native Americans in Louisiana
How the Alexandria town plat was laid out in 1805 by Alexander Fulton
Louisiana under the rule of Spain, France and England 
Famous figures in Louisiana such as Governor Murphy J. Foster, Jr.
The American Revolution 
Civil War  
Construction of the Civil War dam on the Red River by General Joseph Bailey
Camp Beauregard, a United States Army facility in World War I
The Louisiana Maneuvers and Camp Claiborne in Alexandria in World War II 
Politicians from the Central Louisiana area including Huey Long and Earl Kemp Long
Central Louisiana in postcards

See also
Louisiana State MuseumBaton Rouge, New Orleans, and other locations

References

External links
Louisiana History Museum website

Libraries on the National Register of Historic Places in Louisiana
Museums in Rapides Parish, Louisiana
History of Louisiana
History museums in Louisiana
Buildings and structures in Alexandria, Louisiana
Tourist attractions in Alexandria, Louisiana
National Register of Historic Places in Rapides Parish, Louisiana